Palmore is a family name. Notable people with the name include: 

 Erdman B. Palmore (born 1930), American gerontologist 
 John S. Palmore (1917–2017), American judge 
 Roderick A. Palmore, American lawyer and businessperson 
 Tara N. Palmore, American physician-scientist and epidemiologist  
 Walter Palmore (born 1996), American football player

See also 

 Clarke–Palmore House